The Finnish Union of Practical Nurses (SuPer) is a trade union in Finland.

The union was founded in 1948, and soon affiliated to the Confederation of Salaried Employees (TVK).  In 1992, the TVK went bankrupt, and the union transferred to the Finnish Confederation of Professionals (STTK).  By 2005, the union had more than 63,000 members.

References

Finnish Confederation of Professionals
Nursing organizations
Trade unions established in 1948
Healthcare trade unions in Finland